Doe Pond is a small lake north-northeast of Old Forge in Herkimer County, New York. It drains northwest via an unnamed creek that flows into the Independence River.

See also
 List of lakes in New York

References 

Lakes of New York (state)
Lakes of Herkimer County, New York